Jesse Mast is a Canadian country music singer-songwriter from Salmon Arm, British Columbia. He has written with Larry Wayne Clark and toured with Gord Bamford. He won three awards from the North American Country Music Association International in 2014: Songwriter of the Year, Male Vocalist of the Year and Male Entertainer of the Year.

Mast is signed to Cache Entertainment/Sony Music Canada and released his debut single, "Bad Blood", in January 2016. It debuted on the Billboard Canada Country chart in March 2016.

Discography

Singles

Music videos

References

External links

Canadian country singer-songwriters
Canadian male singer-songwriters
Living people
Musicians from British Columbia
Musicians from Edmonton
People from Salmon Arm
21st-century Canadian male singers
Year of birth missing (living people)